Elgin is a census-designated place (CDP) in Santa Cruz County, Arizona, United States.  The population was 161 at the 2010 census.

Geography
Elgin is located along the Babocomari River at  (31.629095, -110.571951). The Babocomari is known to harbor a unique species of fish, belonging to the family Characidae. They are incredibly rare and little is known about them.

Climate
According to the Köppen Climate Classification system, Elgin has a semi-arid climate, abbreviated "BSk" on climate maps.

Demographics

As of the census of 2000, there were 309 people, 123 households, and 86 families residing in the CDP.  The population density was 6.4 people per square mile (2.5/km2).  There were 153 housing units at an average density of 3.2/sq mi (1.2/km2).  The racial makeup of the CDP was 92% White, 3% Native American, 3% from other races, and 2% from two or more races.  14% of the population were Hispanic or Latino of any race.

There were 123 households, out of which 29% had children under the age of 18 living with them, 64% were married couples living together, 4% had a female householder with no husband present, and 29% were non-families. 24% of all households were made up of individuals, and 3% had someone living alone who was 65 years of age or older.  The average household size was 2.5 and the average family size was 3.0.

In the CDP, the population was spread out, with 27% under the age of 18, 4% from 18 to 24, 25% from 25 to 44, 32% from 45 to 64, and 13% who were 65 years of age or older.  The median age was 43 years. For every 100 females, there were 116 males.  For every 100 females age 18 and over, there were 100 males.

The median income for a household in the CDP was $64,167, and the median income for a family was $66,250. Males had a median income of $38,500 versus $21,250 for females. The per capita income for the CDP was $27,909.  About 10% of families and 13% of the population were below the poverty line, including 21% of those under the age of eighteen and 7% of those 65 or over.

Film
The train station sequence in the 1955 film classic Oklahoma!, with Gene Nelson singing and dancing the song "Kansas City" partly atop a moving train, was filmed in Elgin, and the railroad scenes in the 1957 western 3:10 to Yuma, with Glenn Ford and Van Heflin, were filmed in Elgin. The 1948 film “Red River” starring John Wayne and Montgomery Clift used Elgin as the site of most of the exterior shots of the cattle drive. The opening scene of the 1965 movie, “The Sons of Katie Elder,” which also starred John Wayne, used the same train station and a few of the same camera angles as the Oklahoma film

Winemaking
Elgin is the first location in Arizona to engage in commercial scale winemaking. In the 1970s, Gordon Dutt, Ph.D., a soil scientist from the University of Arizona, was intrigued with the similarity between the soil of the Elgin-Sonoita area and that of Burgundy, France. In partnership with A. Blake Brophy, he developed an experimental winery that later developed into the Sonoita Vineyards and that encouraged other vineyards in the area. Presently, growers in the area produce Chardonnay, Sauvignon Blanc, Cabernet Sauvignon, Merlot, Pinot Noir, Mission, and Syrah grapes. In 2009 there were nine vineyards in the region, producing about 50,000 gallons of wine yearly.

Elgin hosts several wine festivals throughout the year, most notably the St. Martin's Day festival and the Fall festival.

The expansion of winemaking in the Elgin-Sonoita area has led to establishment of fine restaurants and bed and breakfasts and has regenerated the economy of this lightly populated, rural area.

Gallery

References

Census-designated places in Santa Cruz County, Arizona
Populated places in the Sonoran Desert